That's My Story is a studio album by American blues musician John Lee Hooker, released in April or May 1960 on Riverside Records. The album was recorded in one session on February 9, 1960 at Reeves Sound Studio in New York City. It was produced by Orrin Keepnews and features the rhythm section from saxophonist Cannonball Adderley's group, which included bassist Sam Jones and drummer Louis Hayes.

Release and reception 

That's My Story was released in 1960 to positive reviews from The Jazz Review and New York Times critic Robert Shelton. By the time of this recording, Hooker's Delta blues style of playing had influenced and become part of the "folk boom" in the United States. Mojo later cited the record as the point when Hooker had "developed the more ruminative side of his work".

Track listing
All songs written by John Lee Hooker except the first track which is an adaptation of "Money (That's What I Want) by Berry Gordy and Janie Bradford, with additional lyrics by John Lee Hooker.

"I Need Some Money" – 2:25
"Come on and See About Me" – 3:06
"I'm Wanderin'" – 5:12
"Democrat Man" – 3:27
"I Want to Talk About You" – 3:02
"Gonna Use My Rod" – 4:20
"Wednesday Evenin' Blues" – 3:34
"No More Doggin' " – 2:42
"One of These Days" – 4:05
"I Believe I'll Go Back Home" – 3:42
"You're Leavin' Me, Baby" – 3:51
"That's My Story" – 4:34

Personnel
Credits for That's My Story adapted from liner notes.

 Paul Bacon – design, cover production  
 Ken Braren – design, cover production  
 Louis Hayes – drums  
 Jack Higgins – engineer  
 John Lee Hooker – guitar, vocals  
 Sam Jones – bass  
 Orrin Keepnews – producer, liner notes  
 Harris Lewine – design, cover production   
 Lawrence Shustak – photography

Notes

References

External links
 That's My Story at Discogs

1960 albums
John Lee Hooker albums
Riverside Records albums
Albums produced by Orrin Keepnews
Albums with cover art by Paul Bacon